The 1979 Canadian Grand Prix was a Formula One motor race held on 30 September 1979 at the Circuit Île Notre-Dame, Montreal.

During practice Niki Lauda announced his retirement from Formula One. The Brabham team, who had replaced their Alfa Romeo-engined BT48 with the Cosworth DFV-engined BT49, recruited Argentine newcomer Ricardo Zunino as Lauda's replacement.

The organizers would not let the Alfa Romeo factory team compete unless they pre-qualified. They refused to do so but a compromise was reached where one of their drivers would be allowed to take part in practice. The other, Bruno Giacomelli, was not allowed to enter the race.

The race turned into a close duel between Alan Jones and Gilles Villeneuve that continued the entire race.

Qualifying

Qualifying classification

Race

Classification

Championship standings after the race

Drivers' Championship standings

Constructors' Championship standings

References

Canadian Grand Prix
Canadian Grand Prix
1979 in Canadian motorsport
Canadian Grand Prix
Grand Prix